Posyolok sovkhoza Trud is a rural locality (a settlement) in Starokriushanskoye Rural Settlement, Petropavlovsky District, Voronezh Oblast, Russia. The population was 74 as of 2010.

References 

Rural localities in Petropavlovsky District, Voronezh Oblast